Pilip Ballach Ó Duibhgeannáin (fl. 1579–1590) was an Irish hereditary historian and member of Clan Ó Duibhgeannáin. The 20th century historian, Paul Walsh, suggested that he was a son of Fer Caogad mac Ferghal Ó Duibhgeannáin, who died at Cloonybried in 1581. Ó Duibhgeannáin was a resident of Cloonybrien, County Roscommon.

Together Brian na Carriag MacDermot and others, he compiled the Annals of Lough Cé, Miscellanea Historica Hibernica, and other manuscripts.

Miscellanea Historica Hibernica
Miscellanea Historica Hibernica, also known as MS G1, is a manuscript miscellany, a miniature vellum book. The commonplace book was compiled by Ó Duibhgeannáin during the years 1579 to 1584. It is described on the front endpaper as Miscellanea Historica Hibernica in a later hand. The book contains an Irish rendering of an extract from a Latin tract found in Roger Bacon's 13th century version of Secretum Secretorum on physiognomy.

References

Irish-language writers
16th-century Irish historians
Irish chroniclers
People from County Roscommon
Irish book and manuscript collectors
Irish scribes
16th-century Irish writers
Year of birth unknown